Dirty Jobs was a reality/factual program on the Nine Network, based on the American version of the same name, in which hosts Jo Beth Taylor and Ben Dark are shown performing difficult, strange, and/or messy occupational duties alongside professional workers.

The show premiered following the premiere of the Australian version of The Singing Bee on 7 October 2007. The show managed lacklustre ratings and was removed after five episodes and replaced with Commercial Breakdown.

References

External links 
 

Nine Network original programming
2000s Australian reality television series
2007 Australian television series debuts
2007 Australian television series endings
Australian television series based on American television series